René Rey (19 September 1928 – February 2011) was a Swiss alpine skier. He competed in the men's slalom at the 1956 Winter Olympics.

References

External links
 

1928 births
2011 deaths
Swiss male alpine skiers
Olympic alpine skiers of Switzerland
Alpine skiers at the 1956 Winter Olympics
Sportspeople from Valais